Paul Wilson (born 16 July 1993) is a Jamaican international footballer who plays as a midfielder for Harrisburg City Islanders in the USL.

Career

Club

Portmore United 

Wilson began his senior club career at Portmore United in Jamaica.

Harrisburg City Islanders 
Wilson has played club football for Portmore United from 2009 until he signed a two-year deal with American side Harrisburg City Islanders who compete in the United Soccer League.

Cavalier
In 2018, Wilson returned to Jamaica and signed with Cavalier F.C.

International

References

External links
City Islanders profile
http://www.uslsoccer.com/roster_players/11487863

1993 births
Living people
Jamaican footballers
Association football midfielders
Portmore United F.C. players
Penn FC players
Jamaican expatriate footballers
Jamaican expatriate sportspeople in the United States
Expatriate soccer players in the United States
USL Championship players
National Premier League players
Jamaica under-20 international footballers
Jamaica youth international footballers
People from Clarendon Parish, Jamaica